Abacetus quadrisignatus is a species of ground beetle in the subfamily Pterostichinae. It was described by Maximilien Chaudoir in 1876.

References

quadrisignatus
Beetles described in 1876